Steve Sylvester may refer to:
Steve Sylvester (American football) (born 1953), American football player
 Steve Sylvester, vocalist of Death SS, Italian heavy metal band
 Steven Sylvester (born 1968), English cricketer